Edward Synge 

(died 1678) was an Anglican clergyman who served in the Church of Ireland as the Bishop of Limerick, Ardfert and Aghadoe (1661–1663) and subsequently the Bishop of Cork, Cloyne and Ross (1663–1678).

A native of Bridgnorth in Shropshire, England, he was educated at Drogheda Grammar School and Trinity College, Dublin. While he was the Dean of Elphin, he was nominated the bishop of Limerick on 6 August 1660 and consecrated on 27 January 1661. He became the bishop of Limerick, Ardfert and Aghadoe when the Anglican sees of Limerick and Ardfert and Aghadoe were united in 1661. He was translated to bishopric of Cork, Cloyne and Ross by letters patent on 21 December 1663.

He died in office on 22 December 1678.

His older brother George Synge (1594–1653) had been bishop of Cloyne (1638–1652) before ejection in the Civil War. His son Edward (1659–1741) and his grandsons Edward (1691–1762) and Nicholas (1693–1771), also became bishops.

References

Bibliography

Further reading 
  The main topic is the son.
 The Synge Letters: Bishop Edward Synge to his Daughter Alicia: Roscommon to Dublin, ed. Marie-Louise Legg, The Lilliput Press in association with The Irish Manuscripts Commission, Dublin 1996.

 

|-

1678 deaths
Bishops of Limerick, Ardfert and Aghadoe
Bishops of Cork, Cloyne and Ross
Deans of Elphin
Year of birth unknown
Bishops of Limerick (Church of Ireland)